Zhu Jiong (Chinese:朱炯, born August 5, 1973) is a Chinese football manager and a former player.

Club career
Zhu Jiong began his career playing for Shanghai Shenhua youth team and would graduate to the senior team during the dawn of full professionalism at the beginning of the 1994 Chinese Jia-A League season. His ability at left back would see him gain significant playing time and by the end of the 1995 Chinese Jia-A League season he would go on to win the league title with Shenhua. His career was cut short when it was discovered that what he and the club thought was a minor meniscus injury was in fact a major cruciate ligament, which ended his career.

Management career
With his career cut short he would move into youth management and would receive his first major assignment in 2006 when he became the manager at the Shanghai Shenhua youth team. By 2007 he would move into assistant management when he joined Shaanxi Baorong Chanba where he was reunited with his old teammate from Shanghai Shenhua, Cheng Yaodong who was the club's manager. At the start of the 2009 Chinese league season Zhu got his first management position at second tier club Nanchang Bayi Hengyuan and in his debut season helped guided the club to a runners-up spot and promotion to the top tier.

Honours

Player

Shanghai Shenhua
Chinese Jia-A League: 1995

References

External links
Profile at Shanghai Shenxin website

1973 births
Living people
Chinese footballers
Footballers from Shanghai
Shanghai Shenhua F.C. players
Chinese football managers
Beijing Renhe F.C. managers
Shanghai Shenxin F.C. managers
Association football defenders